Competitor for  Canada
 

Flat Iron was a First Nations lacrosse player who competed in the 1904 Summer Olympics for Canada. In 1904 he was member of the Mohawk Indians Lacrosse Team which won the bronze medal in the lacrosse tournament.

References

 Profile at Sports Reference.com
 

Year of birth missing
Year of death missing
Canadian lacrosse players
Lacrosse players at the 1904 Summer Olympics
Olympic lacrosse players of Canada
First Nations sportspeople
Canadian Mohawk people
Olympic bronze medalists for Canada